The Winona and St. Peter Engine House is a former engine house in Winona, Minnesota, United States.  It was built around 1890 by the Winona and St. Peter Railroad, a subsidiary of the Chicago and North Western Transportation Company.  The building was listed on the National Register of Historic Places in 1984 for having local significance in the theme of transportation.  It was nominated for being the sole surviving structure of a railroad shop complex that was a major local employer and a component of the rail network that fueled Winona's economy.

The building continued to serve as a locomotive shop until the Chicago and North Western removed its maintenance operations from Winona.  Since 1965 the building has served as a warehouse, and is currently utilized by the Fastenal company of Winona.

See also
 National Register of Historic Places listings in Winona County, Minnesota

References

1890 establishments in Minnesota
Buildings and structures in Winona, Minnesota
National Register of Historic Places in Winona County, Minnesota
Railway buildings and structures on the National Register of Historic Places in Minnesota
Railway depots on the National Register of Historic Places
Transport infrastructure completed in 1890
Chicago and North Western Railway